Rafael de Carvalho Santos, simply known as Rafael Santos (born 14 March 1989), is a Brazilian footballer who plays for Tombense as a goalkeeper.

Club career
Born in Barretos, Rafael Santos joined Corinthians' youth setup in 2004, aged 15. In 2008, he was promoted to the main squad, in Série B, and made his debut on 29 November, starting in a 0–2 loss at América-RN, as Timão were already champions and both Felipe and Júlio César (first and second choices, respectively) were already in vacations.

In June 2011, after being sparingly used by Corinthians, Rafael Santos moved to Avaí on loan until the end of the year. However, his maiden appearance for the Leão da Ilha was on 7 September, in a 1–2 home loss against Santos. He then joined Bragantino and Botafogo-SP, both in temporary deals.

On 10 May 2013 Rafael Santos signed with São Caetano. He was a starter during his debut campaign, which ended in relegation. On 27 June of the following year Rafael Santos moved to Icasa, also in the second division; ten days later, however, he signed a short-term deal with fellow league side Portuguesa.

On 6 May 2015, after being released by Lusa, Rafael Santos signed for Guarani.

References

External links

1988 births
Living people
Footballers from São Paulo (state)
Brazilian footballers
Association football goalkeepers
Campeonato Brasileiro Série A players
Campeonato Brasileiro Série B players
Campeonato Brasileiro Série C players
Sport Club Corinthians Paulista players
Avaí FC players
Clube Atlético Bragantino players
Botafogo Futebol Clube (SP) players
Associação Desportiva São Caetano players
Associação Desportiva Recreativa e Cultural Icasa players
Associação Portuguesa de Desportos players
Guarani FC players
Madureira Esporte Clube players
Tupi Football Club players
Esporte Clube Bahia players
Vila Nova Futebol Clube players
Associação Desportiva Confiança players
People from Barretos